Magnhild Haalke (12 August 1885 – 18 October 1984) was a Norwegian novelist.

Biography
Magnhild Camilla Kvaale  was born on Vikna, an island off the Namdalen coast in Nord-Trøndelag, Norway. She was the second of ten children born to Knut Kvaale (1852–1942) and Kaja Augusta Wiig (1863–1948). She worked as a teacher for 30 years in Sør-Odal in Hedmark.

She made her literary debut in 1935 with the novel Allis sønn. Her deep psychological insight and great environmental descriptions ensured her a lasting place in Norwegian literature.  Eventually she wrote nearly 30 books. Haalke made use of strong, colorful language and  lush figures of speech. Her novels often focused on adult insensitive treatment of defenseless youth. The role of the mother in childhood development was a frequent subject. In several books she wrote of  values relating to childhood environment and family traditions.

Her trilogy Åkfestet (1936), Dagblinket (1937) and Rød haust? (1941) describes the fate of a woman growing up on a small farm. The trilogy was later reworked into two books Grys saga (1950). The trilogy Karenanna Velde (1946), Kaja Augusta (1947) and Kvinneverden (1954) is from a rural district on the coast of Trøndelag. Her final work was her autobiography Mot nytt liv, written at the age of ninety-two.

Haalke was awarded Gyldendal's Endowment in 1949 and the Dobloug Prize in 1980. She was the first recipient of Mads Wiel Nygaards Endowment, which she was awarded in 1953 and which she shared with novelist, Lizzie Juvkam (1883–1969).  From 1954,  she received a national artist salary from the national government.

Personal life
In 1922, she married her second cousin,  artist Hjalmar Kristian Haalke (1894–1964).   She died during 1984 and was buried in the cemetery at Nordstrand Church (Nordstrand kirkegård) in Oslo.

Selected works
Allis sønn, 1935
Åkfestet, 1936
Dagblinket, 1937
Trine Torgersen, 1940
Rød haust?, 1941
Kan vi bygge en bedre menneskeslekt?, 1946 (lecture)
Karenanna Velde, 1946
Kaja Augusta, 1947
Grys saga (contains Åkfestet, Dagblinket og Rød haust?), 2 volumes, 1950
Kvinneverden, 1954
Serinas hus, 1955
Munter kvinne, 1957
Dragspill, 1958 (short stories)
Kommer far i dag?, 1969
Sol og skygge, 1971 (short stories)
Mot nytt liv, 1978 (autobiographical)

References

 
 
 
 
 

1885 births
1984 deaths
People from Vikna
People from Hedmark
People from Sør-Odal
Dobloug Prize winners
Norwegian women novelists
20th-century Norwegian novelists
20th-century Norwegian women writers